The Radical SR8 is a British sports car made by Radical Sportscars.

Dominic Dobson drove one to victory in the 2015 Pikes Peak International Hill Climb.

Michael Vergers held the all-time street legal lap record of the Nordschleife circuit on the Nürburgring until 29 June 2010, doing so in 2009 in a Radical SR8 LM on Dunlop Direzza DZ03 tyres. He clocked a lap time of 6:48:28.

A prototype is being made, with the help of Radical Sportscars, into an all-electric version by Racing Green Endurance, a student-led project of Imperial College London.

Life cycles

References

External links
 Radical Sportscars | Racing | Track Day | Road and Race Cars
 Racing Green Endurance - The Car Racing Green Endurance website

Rear mid-engine, rear-wheel-drive vehicles
Cars of England
Sports cars
2000s cars
2010s cars